Saint-Bonnet-de-Montauroux is a former commune in the Lozère department in southern France. On 1 January 2017, it was merged into the new commune Saint-Bonnet-Laval.

Geography
The Chapeauroux flows northeastward through the commune, forms part of its north-eastern border, then flows into the Allier which forms the commune's eastern border.

See also
Communes of the Lozère department

References

Saintbonnetdemontauroux